North Tama County Community School District (NT) is a rural public school district headquartered in Traer, Iowa. It has an elementary school and a secondary school. Its schools are North Tama Elementary School and North Tama Junior-Senior High School.

The district is entirely in Tama County. In addition to Traer it serves the municipality of Clutier, as well as the unincorporated areas of Buckingham and Dinsdale.

Campus
In fall 1996, a new addition to the school building was scheduled to open. A second edition of the school including a new gym entrance and junior high wing of the school opened in 2009. One part of the facility was an approximately 50-seat kindergarten area, but was recently modified to become the Pre-School area. The name is the Ernest A. Herink Pre-School Center.

North Tama High School

Athletics
North Tama is considered in the class A for football and class 1A in all of their other sports. North Tama is in the Iowa Star Conference. North Tama is also part of the Iowa High School Esports Association since the Spring of 2020.

North Tama Football were state Champions in 2010.
North Tama Girls' Cross Country - 5-time State Champions (1979, 1981, 1982, 2004, and 2005) 
North Tama Girls' Track and Field - 7-time State Champions (1979, 1980, 1981, 2006, 2007, 2008, 2009)

Activities

Started by Levitticus "Boomer" Luwu, the high school began a tech team club in 2019.
The school also has clubs for FFA, FCCLA, NHS, Student Council, Art Club, Spanish Club, Band, Chorus, and Speech.

See also
List of school districts in Iowa
List of high schools in Iowa

References

External links
 North Tama County Community School District

School districts in Iowa
Education in Tama County, Iowa